Lemmysuchus is a genus of machimosaurid thalattosuchian from the Middle Jurassic Callovian of England and France. Like many other teleosauroids from Europe, it has had a convoluted taxonomic history.

History
 
"Steneosaurus" obtusidens was first described from the Callovian-aged Oxford Clay Formation of Cambridgeshire, southeastern England on the basis of a partial skeleton (NHMUK R.3168). Characters cited as diagnostic for "S." obtusidens included: short rostrum (preorbital length 52 percent of total skull length); teeth blunt and rounded at the tips; armor adorned with elongate pit ornamentation.

The validity of "Steneosaurus" obtusidens was disputed in a 1987 paper reviewing the type specimens of nominal teleosauroid species from the Oxford Clay. Characters used by Charles William Andrews to distinguish "S." obtusidens from other species were dismissed as variable within specimens of Steneosaurus edwardsi, and "S." obtusidens was sunk as a junior synonym of Steneosaurus durobrivensis (=S. edwardsi). Some authors considered this taxon a probable junior synonym of Machimosaurus hughii based on a subsequently discovered specimen found in Callovian-age exposures in Calvados, Lower Normandy, France, though they stressed that a taxonomic review of blunt-snouted teleosaurids was needed. This synonymy was accepted in a 2009 paper regarding thalattosuchian morphometrics without comment.

In 2013, a new specimen of Machimosaurus was described from Late Jurassic (Kimmeridgian deposits in southern Germany (later named Machimosaurus buffetauti), and it became clear that variation within blunt-toothed teleosauroids was taxonomically significant enough for "Steneosaurus" obtusidens to be recognized as generically distinct from Machimosaurus. Other cladistic and comparative studies agreed with this assessment, recovering "S." obtusidens in a clade with Machimosaurus and Steneosaurus edwardsi.

In 2017, the species was moved to its own genus, Lemmysuchus, referring to Ian Fraser Kilmister, better known as "Lemmy", of the band Motörhead, and the Greek word for crocodile, .

References 

Fossil taxa described in 2017
Middle Jurassic crocodylomorphs
Middle Jurassic reptiles of Europe
Fossils of France
Fossils of Great Britain
Prehistoric pseudosuchian genera